Moharrum Zumeh (also Romanized as Moḩarrūm Zūmeh; also known as Moḩarram Zūmeh) is a village in Chubar Rural District, Haviq District, Talesh County, Gilan Province, Iran. At the 2006 census, its population was 404, in 85 families.

References 

Populated places in Talesh County